Tui-tā-tui (translation: The king who strikes the knee) was the 11th king of the Tuʻi Tonga, a dynasty in Tonga, who lived during the 12th century AD.

Heketā
Tuitātui had, like his father Momo, his court in Heketā (meaning: cripple hit), near the village of Niutōua on Tongatapu. It was there that he built, as an impressive gateway to the royal compound, the Haamonga-a-Maui. From the Haamonga a path proceeded about 50 m to the slightly elevated esi maka fākinanga, (stone to lean against) where the king sat against with his back, safe from any assassin from that direction. He was a huge, strong man, and easily handled a large stick as whether it was nothing. He hit everybody against the knees who would approach him too closely from the front. At par with this was his introduction of a new kava circle layout (a formal gathering of the chiefs of the country under him), in which the king sat more apart from the others (including supposed assassins) than before.

He also built there at Heketā the earliest known langi (burial tombs)– Langi Heketā and Langi Moungalafa (where four of his children were buried), but he himself would not use them. These stone structures still exist. He also made a sporting field to play sikaulutoa (reed throwing stick).

Rule
In addition to the Tui Tonga maritime empire, Tuitātui also inherited from his father-in-law Loau as a kind of prime minister. Together they put through landownership and social reforms, re-shuffled and strengthened the royal council of the Fale Fā (house of four), the ancient royal counselors and royal guardians of the Tuʻi Tonga. Tuitātui removed from the Fale Fā, Matakehe and Tuifolaha and replaced them with Tuitalau and Tuiamanave from Talau of the northern island of Vava'u.

As a prince Tuitātui probably had had a sheltered life, away from others. One story tells of how Tuitātui did not know that he had an older stepbrother named Fasiapule until he introduced himself to Tuitātui with riddles. The king was impressed and made Fasiapule a governor.

Sāngone
Tongan stories tell that Tuitātui had a pet turtle named Sāngone of which he was very fond. One day a Sāmoan named  Lekapai stole the turtle and ate it. By the time Fasiapule came with a recovery expedition to Savaii, only the shell was left, buried at a secret place and guarded over by the dwarf Lafaipana. Only when Fasiapule had shown he was sharper witted than Lafaipana in solving riddles was he able to get the shell and return it to Tonga.

This story might be symbolic for the start of a revolt in Samoa by the chiefs Lekapai and Lafaipana, counteracted by Loau Tuputoka and Fasiapule. It would still take a century or so before Sāmoans drove out the last Tongan occupier from their soil.

Nua
Another tale recounts how one day Tu'itonga Momo came along the weatherside of Eueiki island and saw a woman with her legs in the sea. For a while he was not sure whether she was a human or an evil ghost, but after some discussion and solving riddles, he decided she was human and asked her to come to Olotele, the residence of the Tui Tonga. She then told her name was Nua, and agreed to come with the king.

Nua bore him three sons,Tu'itatui, Uanga, Afulunga, and Sina, along with a daughter named Fatafehi. Uanga built the Langi Leka, the first langi in Mua, he also moved the royal court there after his father's death.

Last years
Tuitātui had several big houses in Heketā, and they were provided with a high platforms, called fata, made from fehi wood, and as such called fatafehi. The word has since become a royal name in Tonga; one Fatafehi was the king's daughter.

Another Tongan legend states that one day the king climbed up on such a raised platform and yelled to his sister, Lātūtama below: "Oh, some big vessels are coming, from Haapai very likely." "Lies!", his sister answered. "Not lies, come up and see it for yourself. It is a large fleet, 1, 2, 5, no 100 boats I think", the king retorted. So the woman went up, and nothing to be seen. The king then seized her and raped her, knowing that no one could see them. Lātūtama's maiden attendants below saw blood trickling down and asked what it was. "Oh, it is from a flying fox", Tuitātui answered. As such the place is still known as Toipeka (blood drip of the peka (flying fox)).Lātūtama's brothers were enraged on hearing this and swore to kill the king. Tuitātui had to flee to Eua, but did not escape his fate.

Meanwhile, Fasiapule had returned from Fiji, and hearing that Tuitātui was in Eua, he, and a Fijian friend, embarked in their canoe there. They were attracted by a strange light, which on arrival turned out to be the funeral torches of the dead king. Fasiapule killed his Fijian friend, substituted him on the place of Tuitātui and smuggled the body of the latter away from Eua. Approaching Tongatapu, he rested at one of the outer islands and that island from then on was called Motutapu (sacred island), because it had served as a resting place for a Tui Tonga. He then went on to Malapo. But night came, and the procession had to stop on an island in the lagoon, close to Folaha, and that island is still known as Moungatapu (sacred mountain). Next day, Malapo was reached and the body was taken care of by Tuitātui's mother's tribe, the Haangongo.

There are claims that Tuitātui is not buried in Malapo, but in Mua. The people of Uiha claim that he is buried there in the southeast corner of the island. In a remote area is an ancient grave which contain the bones of a huge man and it is Tuitātui's. There is also a claim that he is buried somewhere in one of the small islands south of Uiha known as the Otu Motu Kinekina Felemea, as they have become a symbol for the Tui Tonga for this reason.

References
 I.C. Campbell; Classical Tongan kingship; 1989
 E. Bott; Tonga society at the time of Captain Cook's visit; 1982
 O. Māhina; Ko e ngaahi ata mei he histōlia mo e kalatua o Tongá: Ke tufungai ha lea Tonga fakaako; 2006; 
 E.W. Gifford; Tongan myths and tales; BPB bulletin 8, 1924

Tongan monarchs
History of Tonga
Tongan mythology
People from Tongatapu